Branchiostegus gloerfelti, the Australian tilefish, is a species of marine ray-finned fish, a tilefish belonging to the family Malacanthidae. So far it has only been found in the southwest Sumatra to Bali Strait in Indonesia.

Etymology
The fish is named in honor of fisheries consultant Thomas Gloerfelt-Tarp.

References

Malacanthidae
Taxa named by James Keith Dooley
Taxa named by Patricia J. Kailola
Fish described in 1988